Rugby Club Aubenas Vals is a French rugby union club from Aubenas & Vals-les-Bains, Ardèche that play in the Nationale, third tier of the French league system.

Current standings

References

External links
Official website

Rugby clubs established in 1966
RC Aubenas Vals
Sport in Ardèche